The Forever War is a novel by Joe Haldeman.

The Forever War may also refer to:

 The Forever War (board game), a board game by Mayfair Games
 The Forever War (comics), a graphic novel drawn by Marvano
 The Forever War (non-fiction book), a book by Dexter Filkins about the wars in Afghanistan and Iraq, 1998–2006
 The forever war, a political-science concept of an endless war led for either military or political reasons